Red Moss may refer to:

Red Moss, Aberdeenshire, a wetland bog in Aberdeenshire, Scotland
Red Moss, Greater Manchester, a wetland mossland in Greater Manchester, England